Géza Koroknay (29 September 1948 – 2 January 2013) was a Hungarian actor, most notable for his work on the Hungarian television show Szomszédok (Neighbors).

Biography
Born in Budapest in 1948, Koroknay graduated from the Academy of Drama and Film in 1972. He was soon contracted into the National Theatre of Miskolc acting troupe and was a member of the National Theatre of Pécs from 1974 to 1976. Since then, he was a voice actor for a number of films and television shows, including dubbing some of the Dirty Harry films into Hungarian, to name a few. He also took on some small television roles. He spent his later years as a narrator of documentaries and commercials.

Koroknay died on 2 January 2013, following a lengthy illness.

Filmography
 2012: Barátok közt ... Dezső Winkler (2 episodes)
 2000: Pasik
 1993–1997: Kisváros ... Szabó/Cseresznyés (4 episodes)
 1993: Privát kopó ... Félelem ára
 1987–1991: Szomszédok ... László (52 episodes)
 1990: Angyalbőrben ... Csatár őrnagy
 1989: Labdaálmok
 1986: A falu jegyzője
 1972: Fekete macska ... Suhanc

References

External links

1948 births
2013 deaths
Hungarian male stage actors
Male actors from Budapest
Hungarian male voice actors